Sadiqabad is a tehsil located in Rahim Yar Khan District, Punjab province of Pakistan situated at the border of Sindh and Punjab. It is located on the east bank of the Indus River.

See also
Krishna Temple, Sadiqabad

References

Tehsils of Punjab, Pakistan
Rahim Yar Khan District